Nogales International Airport  is a county-owned public-use airport located  northeast of the central business district of Nogales, a city in Santa Cruz County, Arizona, United States and is also a port of entry into the United States. It is included in the Federal Aviation Administration (FAA) National Plan of Integrated Airport Systems for 2019–2023, in which it is categorized as a local general aviation facility. It is not served by any commercial passenger airlines as of June 2014.

Facilities and aircraft 
It has one runway designated 3/21 with an asphalt surface measuring is 7,200 by 100 feet (2,195 x 30 m). It also has one helipad designated H1 with a concrete surface measuring 97 by 97 feet (30 x 30 m).

For the 12-month period ending April 17, 2017, the airport had 46,850 aircraft operations, an average of 128 per day: 87% general aviation, 9% military, and 4% air taxi. In February 2019, there were 19 aircraft based at this airport: 12 single-engine and 7 multi-engine.

Airlines and destinations

Cargo

References

External links 
 Nogales International Airport (OLS) at Arizona DOT airport directory
 Aerial image as of 26 April 1992 from USGS The National Map
 

Airports in Santa Cruz County, Arizona